The Association of Photographers (AOP), often referred to colloquially as the AOP, is a trade association for British & European professional photographers predominantly, but also has members based globally.

History
It was formed in London, United Kingdom in 1968 as the Association of Fashion and Advertising Photographers by a small group of photographers (later joined by editorial photographers to become AFAEP). United by a common aim to challenge the then unreasonable demands of model agencies, it brought together professional photographers in order to protect their rights and promote photography.

Structure
Constituted as a not-for-profit trade association, today its membership is around 1,000 photographers and assisting photographers. It is also supported by photographers' agents, printers and industry service-providers, as well as manufacturers and suppliers of photographic equipment. The AOP also has 52 affiliated courses at HE and FE level and plays a significant role in promoting, maintaining and developing relationships between all levels of higher and further education and the professional industry.

It is situated at Studio 9, Holborn Studios, 49/50 Eagle Wharf Road, London, N1 7ED.

Function
Since its formation, the principal aims of the AOP have remained the same, and through their campaigning and education work they have improved rights for all photographers. In so doing they created a unique community of professionals. They negotiated the reforms which led to the Copyright, Designs and Patents Act 1988, as well as developing the widely accepted AOP standards of practice, which afford photographers greater protection and control of their work; and wrote Beyond the Lens, the definitive guide to rights, ethics and best business practice in professional photography.

The Association publishes a great deal of information of particular interest to all photographers concerned with their intellectual property rights and business practice, such as their Copyright4Clients web pages on the AOP's website.

Awards
They also created the AOP Awards, an awards scheme for AOP members, "among the most coveted and influential prizes in the commercial image-making industry". It covers Professional, Assisting Photographer & Student photography. In addition, the AOP runs a competition that is open to all photographers, which attracts professionals and amateurs alike. All the winning images from each of the Awards are published in a corresponding book and all images are exhibited at a prominent London venue after the winners have been announced.

Publications
The AOP produces and publishes a book, titled Beyond the Lens

Past presidents
Past Presidents of the Association of Photographers (the role was referred to as Chairman)

68 - 69 Ray Harwood
69 - 70 Michael Boys 
70 - 71 Anthony Blake 
71 - 72 Anthony Blake
72 - 73 Philip Modica    
74 - 75 Philip Modica
75 - 76 Christopher Joyce
76 - 77 Christopher Joyce   
77 - 78 Max Forsythe
78 - 79 Max Forsythe   
79 - 80 Alan Brooking 
80 - 81 Alan Brooking 
81 - 82 Alan Brooking 
82 - 83 Bryce Attwell
83 - 84 Bryce Attwell   
84 - 85 John Timbers                    
85 - 86  Robert Golden          
86 - 87 Geoffrey Frosh  
87 - 88 Rob Brimson  
88 - 89 Rob Brimson
89 - 90 Mike Laye

90 - 91 Alan Brooking / Bob Harris
91 - 92 Bob Harris
92 - 93 Bob Harris
93 - 94 Clive Frost / Max Forsythe (Interim Chairman)
94 - 95 Martin Beckett
95 - 96 Michael Harding
96 - 97 Michael Harding
97 - 98 Tessa Codrington 
98 - 99 Sandra Lousada
99 - 00 Derek Seaward
00 - 01 Adam Woolfitt
01 - 02 Grant Smith
02 - 03 Grant Smith
03 - 04 Anthony Marsland
04 - 05 Anthony Marsland
05 - 06 Michael Harding
06 - 07 Michael Harding
07 - 08 Richard Maxted
08 - 09 Martin Brent
09 - 10 Simon Leach
19 - (current) Tim Flach

References

External links
 

Trade associations based in the United Kingdom
British photography organisations
Organizations established in 1968
Media and communications in the London Borough of Hackney
1968 establishments in the United Kingdom
Photography awards